Marc A. Leishman (born 24 October 1983) is an Australian professional golfer. He has won six times on the PGA Tour. In 2009 he won the Rookie of the Year award on the PGA Tour, the first Australian to win the award.

Career
Leishman was born in Warrnambool, Victoria. He had a very successful amateur career in Australia, winning many junior tournaments. He won the Warrnambool Club Championship as a 13-year-old while playing in the same group as his father. In 2001 he won the Victorian Junior Masters, the South Australian Junior Masters and was the Victorian Boys champion.

He turned professional in 2005. He played on the Von Nida Tour in 2006, winning two tournaments and topping the order of merit. In 2007, he played his rookie season on the Nationwide Tour finishing 92nd on the money list. He won his maiden title on the Nationwide Tour in 2008 at the WNB Golf Classic by a record-equaling (with Chris Smith) eleven shots. He finished the year 19th on the money list to earn his PGA Tour card for the 2009 season.

Leishman was voted the Rookie of the Year in 2009 after recording three top-10 finishes, which included a runner-up finish behind Tiger Woods at the BMW Championship, the third of the four FedEx Cup playoff events. Leishman subsequently qualified for the season ending Tour Championship. He ended the year 53rd on the money list. He recorded his second runner-up finish of his PGA Tour career at the Farmers Insurance Open in 2010. He finished inside the top 100 on the money list in both 2010 and 2011. He reached the BMW Championship in both seasons.

Leishman won his first tournament after 96 starts on the PGA Tour in June 2012 at the Travelers Championship, coming from six strokes back of the 54 hole leaders to win by a stroke. He shot a final round of 62, which included eight birdies and no bogeys to match his career best round and second best comeback in the tournament's history. He became the second Australian to win the event after Greg Norman in 1995.

At the 2013 Masters Tournament, Leishman was the co-leader after the opening round, alongside Sergio García, as he shot a six under total of 66. He maintained his challenge over the second and third rounds to go into the final day two strokes behind the leaders. He finished T-4 with Tiger Woods, four shots off the lead.

In July 2015, in The Open Championship at St Andrews, Leishman finished as joint runner-up after losing in a four-hole aggregate playoff during a Monday finish to the delayed tournament. After coming close to missing the cut after the first two rounds, Leishman shot a 64 during the third round and a 66 in the final round to finish in a tie for first place with Zach Johnson and Louis Oosthuizen. Leishman did have the sole lead of the Championship with six holes to go during the final round but bogeyed the 16th hole to drop back to 15-under-par and an eventual tie. In the resulting four-hole playoff, after finding a divot with his tee shot at the first hole, this led to a bogey while Johnson and Oosthuizen opened with birdies to open up a two-stroke gap over Leishman. A further bogey at the third hole left him three strokes behind on the final hole and out of contention but his tie for second place gave him his best performance in a major to date.

On 19 March 2017, Leishman won his second PGA Tour event, the Arnold Palmer Invitational. On 17 September 2017, he claimed his third PGA Tour event, the BMW Championship with a tournament record −23. On 14 October 2018, Leishman shot a 7-under 65 in the final round to win the CIMB Classic by five strokes and equal Justin Thomas' tournament record of 26-under-par in 2015 on the TPC Kuala Lumpur West course.

In December 2019, Leishman played on the International team at the 2019 Presidents Cup at Royal Melbourne Golf Club in Australia. The U.S. team won 16–14. Leishman went 1–2–2 and halved his Sunday singles match against Rickie Fowler.

In January 2020, Leishman won the Farmers Insurance Open for his fifth PGA Tour title. Leishman shot a final round 65 to come from behind and defeat Jon Rahm by one stroke.

In April 2021, Leishman won the Zurich Classic of New Orleans. He was partnered with countryman Cameron Smith. The duo won in a playoff over Louis Oosthuizen and Charl Schwartzel. Leishman competed at the Tokyo 2020 Olympics, held in July/August 2021, in the men's competition, finishing 51st.

In August 2022, it was announced that Leishman had joined LIV Golf.

Personal life
Leishman is married to Audrey and they have three children. They live in Virginia Beach, Virginia, USA.

On 31 March 2015, Audrey admitted herself to hospital suffering from acute respiratory distress syndrome. Leishman returned from preparations for the 2015 Masters Tournament to be with her. She was put in an induced coma, and toxic shock began to affect her organs. She was given a 5% chance of recovery. In mid-April, she had recovered enough to return home, and Leishman resumed the Tour in New Orleans. He and his wife created the Begin Again Foundation which aids families who need assistance with medical expenses.

Amateur wins
2001 Victorian Junior Masters, Victorian Boys Championship, South Australian Junior Masters
2005 Lake Macquarie Amateur

Professional wins (13)

PGA Tour wins (6)

1Co-sanctioned by the Asian Tour

PGA Tour playoff record (1–2)

European Tour wins (1)

1Co-sanctioned by the Sunshine Tour

European Tour playoff record (0–1)

Nationwide Tour wins (1)

Korean Tour wins (1)

Von Nida Tour wins (4)

Results in major championships
Results not in chronological order in 2020.

CUT = missed the half-way cut
"T" = tied
NT = No tournament due to COVID-19 pandemic

Summary

Most consecutive cuts made – 12 (2016 U.S. Open – 2019 Masters)
Longest streak of top-10s – 1 (six times)

Results in The Players Championship

CUT = missed the halfway cut
"T" indicates a tie for a place
C = Cancelled after the first round due to the COVID-19 pandemic

Results in World Golf Championships
Results not in chronological order before 2015.

1Cancelled due to COVID-19 pandemic

QF, R16, R32, R64 = Round in which player lost in match play
NT = No tournament
"T" = Tied
Note that the Championship and Invitational were discontinued from 2022.

Team appearances
Amateur
Australian Men's Interstate Teams Matches (representing Victoria): 2003 (winners), 2004

Professional
Presidents Cup (representing the International team): 2013, 2015, 2017, 2019
World Cup (representing Australia): 2016, 2018

Recognition
2017 – Greg Norman Medal

See also
2008 Nationwide Tour graduates

References

External links

Marc Leishman player profile, Golf Australia

Australian male golfers
PGA Tour golfers
PGA Tour of Australasia golfers
LIV Golf players
Olympic golfers of Australia
Golfers at the 2020 Summer Olympics
Korn Ferry Tour graduates
Golfers from Virginia
People from Warrnambool
Sportspeople from Virginia Beach, Virginia
1983 births
Living people